World Classic Rockers (or WCR) is a rock supergroup band that was founded based from Las Vegas  in 1995 by Nick St. Nicholas of Steppenwolf. St. Nicholas has toured with the band since its inception, which, in similar fashion to Ringo Starr's All-Starr Band, rotates its lineup depending on the contributing musicians' projects at a given time.

WCR performed for the first time in Fort Lauderdale, Florida on December 10, 1995, with St. Nicholas, Bobby Kimball of Toto, and Joey Molland of Badfinger with Richard Ward, Rosilee, Mike Younce, and Kurt Griffey in the backing band. The three joined Mike Pinera and his Classic Rock All-Stars in putting together a live show for the Harley-Davidson Toys for Tots Run.

Band members

Timeline

Typical setlist
 Evil Ways (Alex Ligertwood)
 Magic Carpet Ride (Nick St. Nicholas & Michael Monarch)
 Sweet Home Alabama (Randall Hall)
 Gimmie Three Steps (Randall Hall)
 Here I Go Again (Aynsley Dunbar)
 Me and Bobby McGee (Rosilee)
 Piece of My Heart (Rosilee)
 Take It Easy (Randy Meisner)
 Take It To The Limit (Randy Meisner)
 Black Magic Woman (Alex Ligertwood)
 Oye Como Va (Alex Ligertwood)
 Anyway You Want It (Aynsley Dunbar)
 Free Bird (Randall Hall)
 Rosanna (Fergie Frederiksen)
 Born To Be Wild (Nick St. Nicholas & Michael Monarch)

References

External links
 Official Site

Rock music groups from Nevada
Rock music supergroups
Musical groups established in 1995
Musical groups from Las Vegas